Lake Sulivan is a body of water on West Falkland, Falkland Islands. It is the largest body of fresh water in the islands. Lake Sulivan is very tiny, but it is the largest lake in the Falkland Islands, which have very little area but many bays.

References

Bodies of water of the Falkland Islands
Lakes of South America
West Falkland
Lakes of subantarctic islands